Ray Dawson (born 8 May 1941) is a former Australian rules footballer who played with Melbourne and South Melbourne in the Victorian Football League (VFL).

Notes

External links 

1941 births
Australian rules footballers from Victoria (Australia)
Melbourne Football Club players
Sydney Swans players
Sale Football Club players
Living people